is a Japanese yuri manga series written and illustrated by Hiromi Takashima. The series was serialized in Shinshokan's Hirari magazine and Flash Wings web publication between August 2010 and March 2017 and is published in English by Seven Seas Entertainment. A sequel series, titled , began publication in the shōjo manga magazine Wings in April 2017. A five-minute original net animation by Zexcs was released on May 7, 2017, followed by a 58-minute original video animation released in theaters on June 9, 2018.

Story
Yui Yamada, a timid girl who enjoys tending to her school's garden, falls in love with the athletic Tomoka Kase. The two eventually begin dating, and the story follows the pair as they face various challenges in their relationship.

Characters

A shy and timid girl who is part of her school's greenery committee and loves weeding the school grounds. She falls in love with Kase and soon begins dating her, although she often gets paranoid over things. After graduating from high school, she goes to Tokyo with Kase to study horticulture at a women's university.

A boyish looking girl who is part of her school's track and field club and has exceedingly good athletic skill, often racing in tournaments. She takes an interest in Yamada and soon starts dating her, although she can sometimes act a little perverted. After graduating from high school, she goes to a sport university in Tokyo.

Yamada's best friend, nicknamed Mikawacchi, who is initially suspicious of her relationship with Kase, having heard various rumors about her. She is quite boisterous but can't stand the sight of blood. After graduation, she goes to a college in Tokyo to study tourism.

A graduate who was in the same track club as Kase and attends the same university Kase later attends. As a result of rumors, she is long believed by Yamada to be Kase's ex-girlfriend, although this is eventually proven to be false.

Media

Manga
The original manga by Hiromi Takashima began publication in the second issue of Shinshokan's Hirari magazine from August 26, 2010. After Hirari ceased publication in 2014, the series moved to Shinshokan's Flash Wings web publication and ran until March 23, 2017. Five tankōbon volumes have been released in Japan as of May 20, 2018. Seven Seas Entertainment licensed the series in English and released the first volume in North America on February 28, 2017. A sequel series, titled Kase-san and Yamada, began serialization in Shinshokan's Wings magazine from April 28, 2017.

Anime
A five-minute animation clip based on the series was announced on March 23, 2017. The clip, titled , was released on Pony Canyon's YouTube channel on May 7, 2017. It was directed by Takuya Satō at Zexcs with character design and key animation by Kyuta Sakai, and features the song  from Hanako Oku's 2012 album, Good-Bye. A Blu-ray Disc of the clip containing a storyboard reel and audio commentary was bundled with the special edition of Kase-san and Apron on July 25, 2017. A new anime project was announced on August 28, 2017, later revealed to be an original video animation that was scheduled for release in Summer 2018, also produced by Zexcs. Satō and Sakai return as director and character designer respectively, while Takeshi Kuchiba will be doing composition. The 58-minute OVA was screened in theaters from June 9, 2018. The main theme is a cover of I WiSH's 2003 song , performed by Minami Takahashi and Ayane Sakura. The OVA had its North American premiere at Anime Expo 2018 on July 8, 2018. Sentai Filmworks licensed the OVA and released it on Blu-ray with an English dub on October 22, 2019 in North America.

Drama CDs
Three drama CDs were produced, featuring the same voice cast from the OVA. The first was bundled with special editions of the fifth manga volume released on May 20, 2018. A second drama CD was included as part of a Cover Song & Audio Drama Album released on June 6, 2018. A third drama CD was exclusively distributed to special ticket holders for the screening of the OVA on June 9, 2018.

References

External links
Official anime website 

Kasd-san and... Exhibit

2010 manga
2017 anime ONAs
2018 anime OVAs
Lesbian fiction
LGBT in anime and manga
Romance anime and manga
School life in anime and manga
Sentai Filmworks
Seven Seas Entertainment titles
Shinshokan manga
Shōjo manga
Yuri (genre) anime and manga
Zexcs